Twentieth Century Club of Lansdowne is a historic club building located at Lansdowne, Delaware County, Pennsylvania. It was built in 1911, and is a -story, rectangular stone and brick building measuring 43 feet, 10 inches, by 95 feet, 6 inches.  It has a small rear wing, slate pyramid-shaped roof with two projecting front gables, and a large articulated chimney.

It was added to the National Register of Historic Places in 1980.

References

Clubhouses on the National Register of Historic Places in Pennsylvania
Buildings and structures completed in 1911
Buildings and structures in Delaware County, Pennsylvania
National Register of Historic Places in Delaware County, Pennsylvania
Lansdowne, Pennsylvania